The Seattle Kraken are a professional ice hockey team based in Seattle. The Kraken compete in the National Hockey League (NHL) as a member of the Pacific Division in the Western Conference and began play during the league's 2021–22 season. They play their home games at Climate Pledge Arena.

In December 2018, the NHL approved a proposal by Seattle Hockey Partners to grant an expansion franchise to the city of Seattle. In July 2020, the Kraken's name and branding were revealed. The Kraken are the first professional hockey team to play in Seattle since the Seattle Totems of the Western Hockey League played their last game in 1975, and the first Seattle hockey team to compete for the Stanley Cup since the Seattle Metropolitans, who won the Cup in 1917 and folded in 1924. On October 26, 2021, the team raised a banner commemorating the 1917 title team.

History
Establishment

The NHL Board of Governors voted unanimously to approve Seattle's expansion team on December 4, 2018, to begin play in the 2021–22 season as a member of the Pacific Division in the Western Conference. As a result, the Arizona Coyotes were shifted from the Pacific Division to the Central Division to balance out the four divisions at eight teams each. The organization hired Ron Francis as their general manager to initiate operations for the team.

On July 23, 2020, the franchise announced their team name, the Seattle Kraken, as well as their team colors, branding, and home jersey. The team's name comes from the mythical kraken of Scandinavian folklore and its resemblance to the native giant Pacific octopus, which is found in the waters of the Puget Sound, near Seattle. On April 30, 2021, the franchise paid the final installment of the $650 million expansion fee, making the Seattle Kraken the 32nd team of the NHL.

First season

On June 24, 2021, the organization hired Dave Hakstol as their inaugural head coach. An expansion draft was held on July 21, 2021, in a similar manner to a previous expansion draft held in 2017 for the Vegas Golden Knights, who were themselves exempt from the 2021 expansion draft.

During the 2021 preseason, the Kraken played their three home games in the home arenas of three Washington state Western Hockey League teams, the Spokane Chiefs, Everett Silvertips, and Seattle Thunderbirds. On October 11, the Kraken named Mark Giordano the team's first captain. They played their first regular season game on October 12, 2021, a 4–3 loss to the Vegas Golden Knights. Ryan Donato scored the team's first goal. The Kraken's first win came in their second game on October 14, when they defeated the Nashville Predators 4–3.

Giordano played his 1,000th career NHL game for the Kraken on March 5, 2022, becoming the first player to reach 1,000 career games as a member of the team. The team honored him at the Kraken's next home game, shortly before trading him to the Toronto Maple Leafs. The Kraken finished their inaugural season in last place in the Pacific Division with a 27–49–6 record and 60 points.

Arena
The team plays home games at Climate Pledge Arena. The arena, at Seattle Center, is a $930 million redevelopment of the former KeyArena and Seattle Center Coliseum. Amazon.com bought the naming rights to Climate Pledge Arena and chose to name the venue after its environmental goals.

The team's primary practice facility, named the Kraken Community Iceplex, is located at Northgate Station (formerly Northgate Mall) and opened in September 2021. The facility has three rinks and is open to the public.

The Kraken's three home preseason games prior to the 2021–22 season were held at Spokane Arena, Angel of the Winds Arena in Everett, and the accesso ShoWare Center in Kent, which are all home to Western Hockey League (WHL) teams. Tickets were sold by the host WHL teams.

The Kraken played their first home game at Climate Pledge Arena on October 23, 2021, a 4–2 loss to the Vancouver Canucks. Vince Dunn scored the first goal in the arena's history for Seattle. They won their first game in the arena on October 26, 2021, a 5–1 victory against the Montreal Canadiens. Their first shutout win at home was a 3–0 victory over the San Jose Sharks on April 29, 2022, the final home game of the inaugural season.

In-arena entertainment

The Kraken use the horn from the MV Hyak ferry boat as their goal horn. At the first two home games, the Hyaks horn was not yet functional, so the team played a recording of it. The team plays the Nirvana song "Lithium" after every Kraken goal at home.

After their first win at home against the Montreal Canadiens on October 26, the Kraken featured a new postgame tradition during the "Three Stars of the Game" ceremony. Instead of the honored players tossing conventional souvenir pucks or sticks to the fans, they threw a plush stuffed toy sockeye salmon into the crowd to mimic Seattle's Pike Place Market fish toss and what the Northwest wild-caught salmon represents to the state of Washington.

Rod Masters, the organist from the 1977 film Slap Shot, became the organist for the Kraken starting with the team's January 1, 2022 home game. As Climate Pledge Arena does not have an organ, Masters played music using electronic keyboards. Masters retired after the 2021–22 season; the Kraken hired 29-year-old Ben Wooley to replace him.

Uniforms
The Kraken first unveiled its inaugural uniforms on July 22, 2021. Deep sea blue served as the base color with ice blue, boundless blue, shadow blue and red as the accent colors.

The Kraken unveiled its "Reverse Retro" uniform in the 2022–23 season, featuring an ice blue base with deep sea blue striping. The design was a callback to the Seattle Ironmen, a defunct Pacific Coast Hockey League team that existed in the 1940s.

Mascot

Buoy, a sea troll, is the Kraken's mascot. He is said to be a nephew of the Fremont Troll. Buoy was introduced prior to a preseason game against the Canucks on October 1, 2022, at Climate Pledge Arena. The Kraken had intended to introduce Buoy around Christmas during the 2021–22 season, but due to game postponements related to the spread of the SARS-CoV-2 Omicron variant, the team decided to wait until prior to the 2022–23 season instead. Reaction to Buoy's debut was polarized, with many observers expressing a strong like or dislike for the mascot. On his Spittin' Chiclets podcast, Paul Bissonnette called Buoy "the ugliest mascot of all time".

During the 2021–22 season, in the absence of an official mascot, the Kraken promoted a "team dog" named Davy Jones. The dog, a four-month-old husky mix rescue dog introduced on January 17, 2022, socialized with fans at home games as he trained to be a therapy dog.

Broadcasting
Radio
Everett Fitzhugh serves as the team's primary radio play-by-play announcer. Fitzhugh had previously done play-by-play for the ECHL's Cincinnati Cyclones. He is the first full-time play-by-play announcer of African-American heritage in NHL history. Former NHL player and Vancouver Canucks broadcaster Dave Tomlinson serves as Fitzhugh's color analyst. Fitzhugh tested positive for COVID-19 prior to the Kraken's first regular season road trip; on radio broadcasts, TV announcer John Forslund and veteran KJR broadcaster Ian Furness filled in on play-by-play duties.

Kraken games are broadcast on KJR-FM 93.3 and KJR 950 AM, the flagship stations of the Kraken Audio Network. During a schedule conflict, some games may be heard on 96.5 KJAQ. The Kraken Audio Network also includes the following stations outside Seattle:

 KTZN AM 550 Anchorage
 KPUG AM 1170 Bellingham
 KBDB-FM 96.7 Forks
 KTKU FM 105.1 HD2 Juneau
 KAPS AM 660 Mount Vernon
 KONP AM 1450 Port Angeles
 KPOJ AM 620 Portland
 KALE AM 960 Richland
 K257FX FM 99.3 Spokane
 KUTI AM 1460 Yakima

Television
Kraken games are broadcast regionally on Root Sports Northwest for the team's first five seasons. Former Hartford Whalers and Carolina Hurricanes broadcaster John Forslund serves as the team's television play-by-play announcer. J. T. Brown is the Kraken's first television analyst. In August 2022, the team hired Eddie Olczyk to be a television analyst alongside Forslund and Brown. Olczyk will maintain his job at TNT as one of the lead analysts and will call Kraken hockey games as his schedule allows.

Alison Lukan is a studio analyst for Root Sports Northwest who filled in for Brown for a few games during the 2021–22 season. Nick Olczyk joined Lukan as a television, radio, and mobile app contributor for the 2022–23 season.

The telecast for the Kraken's February 17, 2022 game against the Winnipeg Jets had Fitzhugh on play-by-play and Brown on color commentary, comprising the first all-Black broadcast booth in NHL history.

In their first season, the Kraken averaged a 0.96 Nielsen rating for games broadcast on Root Sports Northwest. By comparison, the Vegas Golden Knights averaged a 1.87 rating in their first season for games broadcast locally on AT&T Rocky Mountain.

Minor league affiliates
The Coachella Valley Firebirds, the American Hockey League (AHL) affiliate of the Kraken, are based in Thousand Palms, California. Due to the effects of the COVID-19 pandemic and delays in building Acrisure Arena, the Firebirds began play in the 2022–23 season. As their home arena did not open until mid-December 2022, the Firebirds played the first two months of their 2022–23 season in the Seattle metropolitan area at Climate Pledge Arena before playing their first game at Acrisure Arena on December 18, 2022.

The Charlotte Checkers, the primary AHL affiliate of the Florida Panthers, also served as the AHL affiliate for the Kraken during the 2021–22 season due to the delay in the Kraken's AHL team. The Checkers, an independently owned AHL team, had been the affiliate of the Carolina Hurricanes while the Kraken's general manager Ron Francis was working for the Hurricanes.

For their inaugural season, the Kraken's ECHL affiliate was the Texas-based Allen Americans; they were replaced by the Kansas City Mavericks in that capacity for the 2022-23 season.

Season-by-season record
This is a list of the seasons completed by the Kraken. For the full season-by-season history, see List of Seattle Kraken seasons.

GP = Games played, W = Wins, L = Losses, T = Ties, OTL = Overtime Losses, Pts = Points, GF = Goals for, GA = Goals against

Players and personnel

Current roster

Owners

The team is owned by Seattle Hockey Partners, an organization consisting of David Bonderman, Jerry Bruckheimer and Tod Leiweke. Minority owners of the Kraken include Chris Ackerley, Ted Ackerley, Jay Deutsch, Mitch Garber, Adrian Hanauer, Andy Jassy, Marshawn Lynch, Macklemore, Len Potter, Sam Slater, David Wright, and Jeff Wright.

General managers
 Ron Francis, 2019–present

Head coaches

 Dave Hakstol, 2021–present

Team captains
Mark Giordano, 2021–2022

Retired numbers
 32 was retired on October 23, 2021, immediately before the team played their first regular season home game, in recognition of the team being the 32nd to join the NHL and in honor of the 32,000 fans who placed deposits for tickets on the first possible day.
 99 was retired by the NHL for all its member teams in honor of Wayne Gretzky at the 2000 National Hockey League All-Star Game.

Player awards
The Kraken have four player awards that are given after each season. The Kraken's most valuable player, as voted on by Seattle-area media, receives the Pete Muldoon Award. The player with the most mentions in the three stars of each Kraken home game, computed using a points system, wins the Three Stars of the Year Award. The Guyle Fielder Award goes to the teammate who best exemplifies "perseverance, hustle, and dedication" as voted upon by their teammates and coaches. The Fan Favorite Award goes to a player who wins a fan vote.

Franchise records

Scoring leaders
These are the top-ten point-scorers in franchise history. Figures are updated after each completed NHL regular season.
  – current Kraken playerNote:' Pos = Position; GP = Games played; G = Goals; A = Assists; Pts = Points; P/G = Points per game

Individual records

 Most goals in a season: Jared McCann, 27 (2021–22)
 Most assists in a season: Vince Dunn, 28 (2021–22)
 Most points in a season: Jared McCann, 50 (2021–22)
 Most points in a season, defenseman: Vince Dunn, 35 (2021–22)
 Most points in a season, rookie: Matty Beniers (2021–22), 9
 Most penalty minutes in a season: Jeremy Lauzon, 67 (2021–22)
 Best +/– in a season: Carson Soucy, +7 (2021–22)
 Most wins in a season: Philipp Grubauer, 18 (2021–22)
 Most shutouts in a season: Philipp Grubauer, 2 (2021–22)
 Lowest GAA in a season: Chris Driedger, 2.96 (2021–22)
 Highest SV% in a season: Chris Driedger, 0.899 (2021–22)

References

External links
 

 
National Hockey League teams
2018 establishments in Washington (state)
Ice hockey clubs established in 2018
Ice hockey teams in Washington (state)
Kraken in popular culture
Pacific Division (NHL)